is a Japanese footballer who since 2014 has played defender for Fukushima United FC.

Career

Nagoya Grampus
Obu made his official debut for Nagoya Grampus in the J. League Division 1 on 23 July 2014 against Vegalta Sendai in Yurtec Stadium Sendai in Sendai. He played the full match in where his team recorded a 3-3 tie.

Albirex Niigata
On 23 June 2017, Obu moved to Albirex Niigata from Nagoya Grampus.

Career statistics

Club
Updated to end of 2018 season.

References

External links 
Profile at Nagoya Grampus

 

1992 births
Living people
Fukuoka University alumni
Association football people from Fukuoka Prefecture
Japanese footballers
J1 League players
J2 League players
J3 League players
Nagoya Grampus players
Albirex Niigata players
Júbilo Iwata players
Thespakusatsu Gunma players
Fukushima United FC players
Association football defenders
Universiade bronze medalists for Japan
Universiade medalists in football
Medalists at the 2013 Summer Universiade